Charmaine Crooks   (born August 8, 1962), is a Canadian athlete, five-time Olympian and Olympic Silver Medallist (LA '84, 4X400m Relay). Crooks was born in Mandeville, Jamaica, but represented Canada for close to 20 years in athletics. The first Canadian woman to run 800 metres in under two minutes, she won gold medals at the Pan American, Commonwealth, World Cup, and the World Student Games. In 1996, she had the honour of being Canada's Flag Bearer at the Opening Ceremonies of the Atlanta Centennial Olympic Games. She is the fifth child with five sisters and three brothers.

Crooks won the 400 metre title at the first Pan Am Junior Championships in 1980, as well as a silver in the 4 x 400 metre relay. In 1981 she won a bronze at the World Cup in Rome as a member of the America's 4 x 400 metre relay team. She won a gold medal in the 4 x 400 metre relay and placed seventh in a nine-woman field in the individual 400 metre race at the 1982 Commonwealth games. In 1983, she won gold in the 400 metres at the Pan Am Games, and a silver in 4 x 400 metre relay, as well as a silver in the World University games as a member of the 4 x 400 metre team. In 1984 at the Los Angeles Olympics she won silver as a part of the team that set a national record of 3:21.21 for the 4 x 400 metre relay. She finished seventh in the final of the 400 metres in a personal best of 50.45. In 1986, she was again Commonwealth champion as a member of the winning 4 x 400 metre relay squad, and placed 5th in the individual 400 metres; in a close race in which less than half a second separated the second and sixth-place finishers. In 1987 she was on Canada's silver medal 4 x 400 metre relay team at the Pan Am Games. In 1989 at the World Cup she won gold as a member of the America's 4 x 400 metre relay team. She also took home two silver medals in the 400m and as part of Canada's 4 × 400 m relay team; at the Francophone Games in Casablanca in 1989. In 1992, she won a silver medal in the 400 metres at the World Cup and was again a member of the winning America's 4 x 400 metre relay team. At the Commonwealth games in Victoria in 1994, she was silver medallist in the 800 metres, and a bronze medallist in the 4 x 400 metres.

Biography
Crooks is the President and Founder of NGU Consultants (since 1994), a sports marketing, management and corporate consulting company, which provides strategic counsel and growth strategies to major corporations on a national and global basis. She is also a sought-after Keynote speaker, appearing at national and international conferences, corporate meetings and retreats and speaking on topics ranging from team building, leadership, inspiration and the Olympic Movement.

Crooks was elected to the International Olympic Committee (IOC) Athletes Commission in 1996 and was elected as a full voting Member of the IOC from 2000-2004. She continues to serve on the IOC Athletes' Commission, has been a Member of the IOC Press Commission since 2001, and was a founding member of the independent IOC Ethics Commission.

As an elected member of the Executive Board of the Canadian Olympic Committee (COC), Crooks is Chair of Olympians Canada (alumni body of Olympians) and the COC's Awards and Recognition/Hall of Fame Committee. As one of the original 2010 Olympic bid team members (since 1998) she is also one of twenty Directors for the Vancouver Organizing Committee for the 2010 Olympic and Paralympic Winter Games (VANOC), and served on both the VANOC Governance and Strategic Communications Committee.

From 2003-2011, Crooks was elected by her peers to serve on the Executive Board of the alumni body of Olympians, the World Olympians Association (WOA) and was a WOA Vice President. She was the founding and first Chair of the PASO Athletes' Commission. Crooks is a founding member and past member of the International Board of Directors for Right To Play, an athlete-driven international humanitarian organization that uses sports to encourage the development of youth in disadvantaged areas.

Crooks is a member of the 'Champions for Peace' club, a group of more than 90 famous elite athletes created by Peace and Sport, a Monaco-based international organization placed under the High Patronage of H.S.H. Prince Albert II. This group of top level champions, wish to make sport a tool for dialogue and social cohesion.
http://www.peace-sport.org/our-champions-of-peace/

Crooks is a current Board Member of the Canucks Autism Network (CAN) and has been a longstanding honorary Member of Big Sisters of the Lower Mainland since 2000.  She is also a member of FIFA's Organising Committee for Competitions.

In 2006, Crooks was the recipient of the IOC Women in Sport Trophy.

On May 1, 2021, Crooks was named vice president of Canada Soccer.

In December 2022, Crooks was given the Order of Canada.

On March 1, 2023, Crooks was named interim president of Canada Soccer.

References

External links
 
 
 
 
 
 

1962 births
Living people
Canadian female sprinters
Olympic silver medalists for Canada
Olympic track and field athletes of Canada
Athletes (track and field) at the 1984 Summer Olympics
Athletes (track and field) at the 1988 Summer Olympics
Athletes (track and field) at the 1992 Summer Olympics
Athletes (track and field) at the 1996 Summer Olympics
Athletes (track and field) at the 1982 Commonwealth Games
Athletes (track and field) at the 1986 Commonwealth Games
Athletes (track and field) at the 1994 Commonwealth Games
Commonwealth Games gold medallists for Canada
Commonwealth Games silver medallists for Canada
Commonwealth Games bronze medallists for Canada
Athletes (track and field) at the 1983 Pan American Games
Athletes (track and field) at the 1987 Pan American Games
Pan American Games gold medalists for Canada
Pan American Games silver medalists for Canada
Jamaican emigrants to Canada
Black Canadian female track and field athletes
International Olympic Committee members
UTEP Miners women's track and field athletes
Commonwealth Games medallists in athletics
World Athletics Championships athletes for Canada
Medalists at the 1984 Summer Olympics
Olympic silver medalists in athletics (track and field)
Pan American Games medalists in athletics (track and field)
Universiade medalists in athletics (track and field)
Universiade silver medalists for Canada
World Athletics Indoor Championships medalists
Medalists at the 1983 Summer Universiade
Medalists at the 1983 Pan American Games
Medalists at the 1987 Pan American Games
Olympic female sprinters
People from Mandeville, Jamaica
Medallists at the 1982 Commonwealth Games
Medallists at the 1986 Commonwealth Games
Medallists at the 1994 Commonwealth Games